The Foundation for Intentional Community (FIC), formerly the Fellowship of Intentional Communities then the Fellowship for Intentional Community, provides publications, referrals, support services, and "sharing opportunities" for a wide range of intentional communities including: cohousing groups, community land trusts, communal societies, class-harmony communities, and ecovillages, along with community networks, support organizations, and people seeking a home in community. The FIC is a nonprofit 501(c)(3) organization in the United States. [Details about Fellowship for Intentional Community Inc., EIN: 35-1856776, Rutledge, MO, United States". 403 | Internal Revenue Service. Retrieved June 30, 2019.]

Activities
The FIC publishes the Communities Directory, and other books, and the Intentional Communities web site: www.IC.org. Online events include presentations, interactive seminars, a discussion forum, and pod casts. A fund for BIPOC intentional communities gathers donations and dispenses grants. It also sponsors and presents periodic Community gatherings, including annual gatherings at Twin Oaks and other community-related events online and in various locations around the US.

FIC History:

• The Foundation – Reformation of the Foundation for Intentional Community: 2019 to Present

• Second Fellowship – Renewal of the Fellowship for Intentional Community: 1986-2019 (33 years)

• First Fellowship – Rise of the Fellowship of Intentional Communities: 1949-1986 (37 years)

• References

The Foundation - Reformation of the Foundation for Intentional Community: 2019 – Present 

	The summer 2019 Communities magazine issue reported the second name change for the FIC, this time to the “Foundation for Intentional Community.” A new logo was created, an executive group of four co-directors was instituted, and the FIC agreed to transfer Communities magazine to the Global Ecovillage Network – United States (GEN-US), a fellow GENNA Alliance member organization. With the Covid-19 pandemic beginning that year, most in-person community networking meetings ceased. (FIC, 2020, p. 1; Tina, 2019, pp. 4-5)

	While the 1st Fellowship relied upon Community Service, and the 2nd Fellowship relied upon the Federation of Egalitarian Communities, the Foundation soon grew to be self-supporting through income from its own programs, especially the registrations for its online workshops and trainings. The 2nd Fellowship had paid some staff members, yet with increasing income every year since 2020 the Foundation has been able to increase its staffing, providing improved and additional movement services. 

	Online community movement networking continued through the pandemic and after, and the new FIC began a series of virtual events, connecting people in community with each other, and connecting with those not in community who are interested in the lifestyle. The FIC 2020 Annual Report stated that the FIC’s online workshops and trainings attracted over 3,500 people paying sliding-scale registrations. Nearly a half-million people visited the FIC’s free online directory at IC.org, which presented over 1,000 intentional communities. 10,000 copies of free FIC e-books and guides were downloaded, and 1,500 books were distributed worldwide. (FIC, 2020, p. 2)

	In 2020 the FIC created the BIPOC Intentional Communities Fund to encourage and support Black, Indigenous, and People of Color in joining or forming intentional community. Ten-percent of unrestricted donations to the FIC have been contributed to the fund. A BIPOC Council of interested persons was created to carry on outreach, and to set criteria for managing the fund and for granting awards. The Council began its first funding round in July, 2021. (FIC, 2020, p. 3; FIC, 2021, p. 9)

	The 2021 FIC Annual Report states the organization’s mission as, “We uplift, connect, and empower all those venturing to join, grow, and learn from intentional communities.” And its vision as, “We envision a just, resilient, and cooperative world where everyone has the opportunity to thrive in community.” That year the FIC began a series of very successful five-week courses on intentional community, which provides the largest amount of revenue of all the FIC programs, accounting for half of the organization’s income. (FIC 2021, pp. 4, 8)

	July, 2021 the FIC’s BIPOC Intentional Communities Fund began awarding grants to groups that have land or are ready to purchase land. (FIC, 2021, p. 9)

	The FIC hosted over 100 online events in 2021, including webinars, workshops, trainings, courses, and networking, with over 10,000 attendees. Over 2,000 books, e-books, and videos were sold. New projects included the Inside Community Podcast, the online Intentional Community Discussion Forum, and a free, short, Starter Guide to Intentional Communities ebook was published, available at: www.ic.org/starterguide. (FIC, 2021, pp. 13, 15, 16, 20, 21)

	The 2022 FIC Annual Report states that the FIC added 109 new listings to the online Intentional Community database, and offered On-Demand Courses involving over 100 people, while 6,500 people participated in all of the FIC online events. The FIC sold 7,000 books in 2022, the Intentional Community Discussion Forum involved 1,000 users, and the Community Podcast presented 15 episodes, played 20,000 times for listeners in 51 countries. The BIPOC Intentional Communities Fund granted $15,000 to three BIPOC community projects in 2022. (FIC, 2022, pp. 10, 12, 13, 14, 15, 19, 20)

Second Fellowship - Renewal of the Fellowship for Intentional Community: 1986 – 2019 

	While the First Fellowship was begun by and largely sustained by Community Service and members of The Vale community, the Second Fellowship was largely sustained by the Federation of Egalitarian Communities (FEC) founded in 1976, especially its largest member groups: Twin Oaks and East Wind. Both Community Service and the Federation devoted money and personnel to network the larger communities movement, for one decade in the case of Community Service, and for three decades in the case of the FEC. 

	It was good timing that Charles Betterton undertook to reorganize the Fellowship ten years after the founding of the Federation, as by that time the Federation was well established and organized, and had been considering how to engage with the larger communities movement. The FEC was always and remains a small network of communities, with from 200 to maybe 250 people at the most. With successful community-owned businesses and gender-equal domestic programs, all integrated in a communal, vacation-credit, labor-sharing, time-based economy in each community, the FEC was ready and able to contribute significant resources of time, money, and skills on a stable, long-term basis to the new continental community organization.

	Stelle Community in northern Illinois was started in 1973 with the intent of being a center for the survival of the human race beyond the disaster prophesied for the end of the millennium. One member of the community, Charles Betterton, began looking beyond Stelle to the idea that intentional community is important to the survival and growth of humanity, and thus began working for the intentional communities movement, looking to network existing organizations rather than form a new one. 

	During the years 1983 to ’86 Charles Betterton took a number of initiatives to build an inclusive community networking organization. Among them, he advocated the networking of existing intentional communities at academic conferences of the National Historic Communal Societies Association (NHCSA), now the Communal Societies Association (CSA), and negotiated with Twin Oaks Community to take over Communities magazine, making the transfer in 1984. Several people were attracted to Charles’ vision, working together to help realize it.

	Charles Betterton attended the spring 1986 combined FIC/CESCI meeting at Tanguy Homesteads in Pennsylvania, also attended by: Herb Goldstein of Common Ground, VA, School of Living (SoL), Inter-Communities of Virginia (I-CV), and Community Educational Service Council (CESCI); Harvey Baker of Dunmire Hollow, TN; Allen Butcher of Twin Oaks, VA; representatives from the Camphill Village communities; and others. Charles announced that he would incorporate the FIC autumn of that year at Stelle, asking for interested persons to attend and form a board-of-directors. Allen suggested to Laird Schaub of Sandhill Farm, MO and the FEC that the Federation support the new FIC, and invited Dan Questenberry of Shannon Farm, VA and I-CV to also support the new community networking initiative. (Ringrose & Brown, pp. 132-5)

	Five people attended the autumn of 1986 FIC incorporation meeting at Stelle and signed on as incorporators of the renewed FIC: Charles Betterton of Stelle Community; Allen Butcher of Twin Oaks Community and the School of Living, Laird Schaub of Sandhill Community and the FEC; Dan Questenberry of Shannon Farm in Virginia and I-CV; and Donald Pitzer of NHCSA and the Center for Communal Studies (CCS) at the University of Southern Indiana. One more FIC meeting was held at Stelle (spring 1987) before the Fellowship board was to go on the road, scheduling meetings to be hosted by different intentional communities. Charles Betterton soon dropped out of the FIC, later joining an Emissary community in Indiana called Oakwood Farm, and a four-person administrative committee was created in his place.

	At the 1988 Green Pastures, NH meeting a set of “Community Visit Report Guidelines” was created for FIC board members to make written reports of communities they visited as representatives of the FIC, with the intent of writing the report to be communicated to the group prior to the visit, assuring their right to review and respond.

	Larid Schaub of Sandhill Farm, or simply Laird Sandhill, invited a number of community activists to the FIC board-of-directors, including Geoph Kozeny of Purple Rose/Stardance in San Francisco, Caroline Estes of Alpha Farm in Oregon, and Betty Didcoct of Linnea/Turtle Island Earth Stweards in Washington state, all three of whom had been active in the Westcoast regional Earth Communities Network (ECN). Thus, the Fellowship for Intentional Community realized the ideal of a nation-wide representation of intentional communities in its organization. (Schaub, 2022, p. 53)  

	Caroline Estes was a group-process trainer and consensus facilitator, Betty Didcoct lived in and was active in the community land trust movement, and Geoph Kozeny became the lead organizer for the 1990/91 Communities Directory, and created a two-DVD set of videos about intentional communities he had visited, titled Visions of Utopia. The first volume published in 2004 presents an historical overview of intentional communities with profiles of seven contemporary groups, and the second volume published posthumously in 2009 by the FIC presents eleven more contemporary intentional communities.

	Charles Betterton had taken out a CESCI loan to fund his publishing of Communities magazine, and was now in default since the publication could not obtain a sufficient circulation of paid subscriptions. By 1989 the FIC wanted to publish a new directory of intentional communities, since directories typically generated a positive cash-flow, yet did not have the money. At a CESCI board meeting Allen Butcher proposed making another loan to the FIC to print a directory. As soon as the proposal was approved, Dan Questenberry exploded with an incredulous expression of the group’s total lack of respect for orthodox business sense in our pouring of more money into something that had already lost a couple thousand dollars! Herb Goldstein’s smile at Dan’s faked protest expressed the sentiment that the group was doing absolutely what needed to be done. The FIC printed a succession of directories: 1990/91, 1995, 2000, 2005, 2007, 2010, and 2016, all of which generated a positive cash-flow.

	Gradually the FIC took on more and more movement activities, including publishing Communities magazine. Charles Betterton and staff at Stelle and elsewhere produced the magazine for eight years, until the FIC agreed to take it on, with Laird Sandhill serving as the Managing Editor, beginning with the fall/winter 1992 issue number 79. 

	The FIC organized a six-day, national conference called the “Celebration of Community” at Evergreen State College in Olympia, Washington in August of 1993, attended by about 800 people. The Celebration offering panel discussions, 160 workshops, and nine plenary presenters: Caroline Estes, Kirkpatrick Sale, Dorothy Maclean, Debra Lynn Dadd-Redalia, Corine McLaughlin, Gordon Davidson, Dr. Noel Brown, Patch Adams MD, and Catherine Burton. The event did a little better than break even. (Didcoct, pp. 5, 18-32)

	In 1994 Elph Morgan (unrelated to the CSI Morgans) of the FIC acquired an Internet domain name, at IC.org, when it was still possible to get a two-letter domain. Along with Communities Directory book sales, the FIC created in 2004 an online, free, searchable database of intentional communities, supported by selling advertising on the website. (Didcoct, ed., pp. 18-47; FIC 2020, p. 7; Schaub, 1992, p. 2; Schaub, 2015, p. 6) 

	The FIC also took on management of the CESCI revolving loan fund, and took on the Community Bookstore, selling books online and at conferences of various community organizations. In 1997 the FIC began conducting a series of “Art of Community” weekend educational and networking gatherings. 

	Laird Sandhill reported an awareness in 2006 on the part of the Communities magazine staff of a significant change in the communities movement. Previously, there had been an assumption that most intentional communities were nonprofit organizations, including land trusts and communal societies. However, there was a growing movement of communities organized as forms of for-profit organization, especially cohousing communities using the condominium legal structure, which comprised about one-third of all the groups in the 2010 Communities Directory. Another form of for-profit community is those in which the land is owned by one person, a couple, or a small group of members with others as renters. Data analysis of the 2010 Communities Directory shows that twenty-percent of the listings were of this type, with the largest example being Ganas Community on Statin Island, NY. A name in use for this type of community is “class-harmony community,” indicating that the group has both an owner class and a renter class. Clearly, about half of all the groups in the Communities Directory are some type of for-profit organization. In 2006 the Communities magazine editors decided to “publish at least one article every issue that highlighted efforts to develop a sense of community independent of commonly held property.” (Schaub, 2022, p. 52)

	Over the years there were many people who were part of the Administrative Committee, the Executive Committee, the Oversight Committee, the Board-of-Directors, and so many workgroups. Faith Morgan served on many of them, as did her mother Jane Morgan before her. Faith commented that she had been attending FIC meetings since she was a child. 

	A steady stream of people serving the Fellowship were from Federation communities, both current and former members. Among them the person with the longest and most involved contribution, besides the Community Service folks, is Laird Sandhill, who wrote …
"After a long run (28 years before the masthead [note: since 1987]) I stepped down as FIC’s main administrator at the end of 2015, and retired from active involvement in the organization …" (Schaub, 2015, p. 53)

	The next Executive Director of the Fellowship was Sky Blue. Sky had been a child member of Twin Oaks, left with his parents, then returned as an adult member. Sky Twin Oaks served until the restructuring of the FIC in 2019. In addition to being an effective administrator, often traveling to represent the FIC at various events, Sky expanded the FIC’s definition of “intentional community” to include Transition Towns, with a listing for the Transition Headquarters appearing in the 2016 Communities Directory. 

	For many years there had been various efforts to form an alliance, or some kind of formal working relationship, between the FIC and various newly arising ecovillage networks and other related organizations. In 2018 six organizations formed the GENNA Alliance. The name comes from the Global Ecovillage Network – North America (GENNA), involving an ongoing network of about twenty networkers. (Tina, 2018, pp. 14-15)

"We envision a world of interdependent cooperative communities stewarding the conditions of regeneration, justice, peace, and abundance, in order to realize the full potential of flourishing for all life, for all generations to come. – GENNA Alliance" 
(Tina, 2018, p. 15)

First Fellowship - Rise of the Fellowship of Intentional Communities: 1949 – 1986 

	The founding of the original Fellowship for Intentional Community (FIC) was inspired by Arthur Morgan. While Morgan was preoccupied with other endeavors, his son Gris along with Al Andersen and Art Wiser took on the development of the organization. 

	Arthur Morgan (1878-1975) served a term as the vice president of the American Unitarian Association, was the first president of the Progressive Education Association, and vice president of the American Society of Civil Engineers. Morgan was appointed by Franklin Roosevelt as the first chairman of the Tennessee Valley Authority. (Morgan, 1942, back cover; Miller, 1998, p. 163) 

	Morgan created an association for the advancement of the small village-like community through which he believed that people could best enjoy “good will and mutual confidence [as] the very life-principle of society.” Community Service, Inc. was created in 1940 to advocate for the resurgence of the idealistic small-town family life, while the later Fellowship of Intentional Communities was created as an association of the full range of communitarian societies, including: secular and religious communities, communal societies, co-operative communities, community land trusts (CLTs), and other groups. Yet before those two associations were begun Arthur Morgan had already created one large and successful community land trust, although that term was not in use at the time. (Morgan, 1942, p. 9) 

	Celo Community was founded in 1936, and a significant source of support and of members for the forming of Celo came from the Quaker social service organization called the American Friends Service Committee (AFSC), and other anti-war pacifists. The irony is that the financing for the 1,250 acre land purchase came from a wealthy Chicago industrialist. William Regnery believed in the ideal expressed in earlier times of the “Roman citizen-soldier” and of the “Jeffersonian landed yeomanry” as the foundation of a democratic republic. The form Celo was to take was that created by Ralph Borsodi (1886-1977) who founded the School of Living, advocating the community design of homesteads leased from a nonprofit association that owns the land. Because of this land tenure design, and the longevity of Celo Community, Celo is considered to be the first community land trust, although more often New Communities Inc. of Albany, Georgia founded in 1969 is called the first CLT. (Miller, 1998, pp. 156-7, 231 n.100)

	Arthur Morgan had two sons, Ernest (1906-2001) and Griscom (1912-1993). Gris and his wife Jane founded The Vale community in 1946 on forty acres, two miles south of Yellow Springs, Ohio. The Vale incorporated in 1960, and in 1980 the land was donated to the Community Service, Inc. Land Trust, growing to eleven families or about twenty people, some of Quaker orientation, along with some Community Service, Inc. (CSI) assistants and Antioch College students in residence. Ernest and his wife Elizabeth lived at Celo in North Carolina. 

	Gris and Jane had two children, Faith who was active on the boards of CSI, FIC, and CESCI, and John who lives at Raven Rocks community, founded in 1970 near Beallsville, Ohio. Raven Rocks was described in the fall 2015 issue number 168 of Communities magazine (p. 53) as having been purchased “to protect 850 acres of Appalachian forest and ravines from strip mining,” and in the winter 1993 issue number 79 of Communities magazine (p. 12) as having its own concrete business for building passive solar, earth-bermed or underground houses. (Fairfield, 1971, p. 20; Miller, 1998, p. 169; Questenberry, p. 119; FIC, 2010, p. 302)

	Arthur Morgan founded Community Service, Inc. (CSI) in 1940, and a description of Morgan’s intention for CSI is printed in a quote in Mildred Loomis’ Alternative Americas, although she does not credit the source.

"Community Service undertakes to increase knowledge of community life and the concern for it. Those who see the limiting and depressing qualities of small community life seldom have the vision of what a good community can be, how it can meet the fundamental needs and cravings of a human spirit. Community Service seeks to clarify a vision of community and to help many people to share it, so that work for community betterment shall not consist of patchwork efforts, but shall lead to the fulfillment of a truly great concept of community life." (Author unknown. Quoted in Loomis, 1980, p. 123)

	The anonymous quote above shows that Community Service has a unique orientation to the communities movement, somewhat closer to the small town or Transition Town “circumstantial community” than to the more deliberate intentional community. Richard Fairfield, who traveled among and wrote about intentional communities in the 1960s, noted the difference from reading the CSI newsletter saying, “I felt that the ideas it expressed were very much out of touch with the newly developing movement.”  (Fairfield, 1971, p. 21)

	Robert Fogarty was a professor at Antioch College in Yellow Springs, OH, very familiar with the Morgans and CSI, although in his 1972 book American Utopianism he does not mention them, while describing the 1960s-‘70s era communities movement as follows.

"Since the mid-sixties there has been a dramatic resurgence of interest in communitarianism. A revolt against the Vietnam War and a technocratic society coupled with a widespread use of drugs combined to produce dropouts who sought an alternative culture. There is no single coherent philosophy – as with Owenism or Fourierism – but an amalgam of attitudes and ideas that are pacific and egalitarian." (Fogarty, p. 150)

	While the mission of Community Service, Inc. was primarily for the promotion of family life in small towns, Timothy Miller states that, “Morgan’s interests had always included communal settlements.” This can be seen in the programs which soon grew out of CSI. While Arthur Morgan promoted small-town life in regular conferences at Yellow Springs, a person in attendance who was associated with Tanguy Homesteads in Pennsylvania, Alfred Andersen, recommended that CSI expand its scope to include communitarian groups. (Andersen, 1997, p. 13; Miller, 1998, pp. 163)

	Alfred Andersen explains in an article in the winter ‘97 issue of Communities magazine (#97), titled “Fellowship Roots,” that while he was in prison serving time as a conscientious objector to military service during World War Two, his wife Dorothy and their son lived at Tanguy Homesteads in Glen Mills, PA, and that soon after his release the three, "… headed for Yellow Springs, Ohio, to renew my acquaintance with Arthur Morgan … to help Arthur and Griscom Morgan’s work at Community Service, Inc. While doing research in the communities movement I had come across descriptions of the scattered and struggling “cooperative” communities, so I suggested that Community Service host representatives to a gathering in Yellow Springs following its annual Small Community Conference." (Andersen, 1997, p. 13)

	Evidently, the implementation of Andersen’s suggestion resulted in a sufficiently successful event that Community Service, Inc. then formed an association during 1946 and ‘47, for the barter exchanges of agricultural products and crafts between communitarian settlements called, “Inter-Community Exchange” (I-CE). Other types of exchanges and mutual aid facilitated at least in part with the help of the I-CE are presented in CSI’s 1988 Guidebook for Intentional Communities. These include the Highlander Folk School taking on Koinonia’s summer camp when the latter community was being attacked by the Ku Klux Klan, and The Vale giving its own water supply pump system to the newly immigrated Bruderhof, when the town of Yellow Springs provided access to city water for The Vale. Miller writes that through these exchanges and through meeting representatives of other communities at CSI meetings and conferences, some members of various communities began expressing interest in visiting some of the communities in the network being created by CSI. (Andersen, 1997, p. 13; Miller, 1998, pp. 163; Morgan, Griscom, 1988, p.10)

	In his 1997 Communities magazine article Andersen explains the vision and the contrary reality of Inter-Communities Exchange. …
"Our hope was that we could develop an entire alternative economy of trading among cooperative communities. … It was only after a year or two that we realized the main thing we had to exchange was fellowship." (Andersen, 1997, p 12)

	In the 1988 Community Service, Inc. publication titled, Guidebook for Intentional Communities, revised from the earlier 1978 CSI publication titled, An Intentional Community Handbook, Gris Morgan edited an article titled, “Some Basic Concepts for Intentional Communities,” saying that at the 1949 Community Service Conference attended by sixty people from four continents, a subgroup was delegated the task of “defining and naming the common subject of shared interest.” (Morgan, Griscom, 1988, p. 9)

"The term “intentional” was chosen to emphasize the basic characteristic of intent, purpose and commitment. Other words such as “cooperative,” “experimental” or “utopian” lacked that connotation." (Morgan, Griscom, 1988, p. 9)

	The date of the founding of the new organization is sometimes given as 1948, such as in Dan Questenberry’s 1990 article, “Residential Land Trust Organizing,” in The 1990/91 Directory of Intentional Communities, although in Gris Morgan’s and CSI’s 1988 Guidebook the event that took place in ‘48 is referred to as a “pre-organizational meeting,” with the official founding of the Fellowship being in 1949, after a year of community networking. It was in that year that the term “intentional” was used for the new name of the expanded Inter-Communities Exchange. 

	The term “exchange” had been used extensively during the Great Depression to refer to many different, and often very large urban labor exchanges, some operating production facilities and businesses without the use of money. Today, similar exchanges are often called “Mutual Aid Networks.”  

	At the 1949 Community Service Conference the Inter-Communities Exchange then became the “Fellowship of Intentional Communities” (FIC). Timothy Miller gives Art Wiser, a member of the Macedonia community in Georgia which later joined the Bruderhof, much of the credit for evolving the Inter-Community Exchange into the FIC. (Miller, 1998, p. 163; Morgan, Griscom, 1988, p. 10) 

	Gris Morgan explains in the Guidebook article that Fellowship of Intentional Communities meetings were held around the Mid-Western and Mid-Atlantic states, including at Antioch College’s Outdoor Education Center called Glen Helen, at the Highlander Folk School in Kentucky, and at the Pendle Hill Quaker Center in Pennsylvania. The extent of the Fellowship can be somewhat gaged by the report in the March 1960 Fellowship newsletter that during the previous October a 250-piece mailing was sent out asking for contributions to the newsletter, with replies received from 125 individuals and five communities in twenty-eight states, Canada, Mexico, Holland, and India. (Morgan, 1960, pp. 7-8) 

	Also in the March 1960 FIC newsletter, Griscom Morgan explains that in 1959 he conducted an outreach effort to a number of different Native American tribes. 

"I visited with tribal leaders of six tribes, as well as talking among a number of others, exploring their interest in fellowship with non-Indians holding some of the same values and concerns in intentional community, land-holding, and mutual respect between cultures. Some of the Indians were keenly interested, saying that this was the kind of fellowship that would make possible the opening [of] the door of deeper contact as compared with the strained relationship with the prying, curious, or “scientific” … Some of these were younger men who are now deeply fired with the challenge of bearing the Indians’ “testimony” in the world … So the leading older traditionals are not the only ones who are vigorously bearing the Indian heritage.

	… [S]ome of our intentional communities … might do well to cultivate fellowship with some of the tribal groups, to reinforce each other in our distinctive ways, to learn from each other, and to help each other from our diverse assets of competence and circumstance. For example, the Cherokee of North Carolina have a form of landholding similar to that at Celo. Each has difficulties in maintaining it and is surrounded by another culture. … Similarly, among some tribes and Pueblos, the traditional reliance upon “sense of the meeting” as compared with voting is under attack by those who assume that the conventional reliance upon voting is the only way of conducting a meeting democratically. We could strengthen these people by our contact and fellowship with them and they could do the same to us." (Morgan, 1960, p. 8)

	A list of nineteen communities in the U.S. associated with the Fellowship of Intentional Communities in its first decade includes: Bruderhof, Rifton, NY; Bryn Gweled, Clarksville, PA; Canterbury, Concord, NH [Quaker group that acquired land from the Canterbury Shakers]; Celo, Burnsville, NC; Gould Farm, Great Barrington, MA; Hidden Springs, Neshanic Station, NJ; Kingwood, Frenchtown, NJ; Koinonia Farm, Americus, GA; Macedonia, Clarksville, GA; May Valley [later Teramanto], Renton, WA; Parishfield, Brighton, MI; Pendle Hill, Wallingford, PA; Powelton Village, [location of one of the MOVE houses in University City] Philadelphia, PA; Quest, Royal Oak, MI; Skyview Acres, Pomona, NY; St. Francis Acres [with the Libertarian Press, printing Cooperative Living newsletter], Glen Gardner, NJ; Tanguy Homesteads, West Chester, PA; The Vale, Yellow Springs, OH; and Tuolumne Co-operative Farms, Modesto, CA. Other intentional communities attended Fellowship events over the decades. (Andersen, 11-22-1991; Miller, 1998, pp. 164-71; Morris & Kross, p. 101; Veysey, pp. 39-40)

	Timothy Miller explains that this network of communitarian groups included “fully communal” societies, along with economically-diverse communities like community land trusts “in which family finances were largely private” while the land is owned in common. Some of the FIC-associated communities were secular, many of them were religious groups, and some were multi-faith. While some of the religious-identified communities were made up of members with mainline or liberal Protestant backgrounds, the primary denomination represented was Quaker. (Miller, 1998, p. 164)

	Along with inventing a term for describing their gifting and sharing lifestyles, the original or first Fellowship also defined what they meant by the word “community,” identifying the basic aspects of communitarian theory and organization. This material, edited by the present author, was first printed by Community Service, Inc. in The Intentional Communities 1959 Yearbook and Newsletter, later in CSI’s An Intentional Community Handbook printed in 1978, and then in CSI’s Guidebook for Intentional Communities published in 1988, which Robert Fogarty then presented in his 1972 book, American Utopianism. 
Size – minimum size should be three families or five adults. 
Organization – The group should be sufficiently organized to be a recognizable social entity acting with responsibility and effectiveness. 
Location – The group should share land and housing or be other-wise close enough together geographically to be in continuous active fellowship and be able to work out effectively the total way of life to which they are dedicated. (Fogarty, p. 151; Morgan, Griscom, 1988, p. 10)

	Robert Fogarty presents a list of seven “basic concepts” and six “principles” of “each of the communities belonging to the Fellowship.” For a sampling:
1.	Community means mutuality and sharing in a whole way of life, in all its values and all its responsibilities.  
2.	The essence of community is spiritual, that is, the feeling of mutuality, the practice of mutual respect, love and understanding. No physical forms or practices will create community, but forms, methods and practices will grow out of the spirit. … (Fogarty, pp. 151-2)  

	It was during the 1954 Fellowship meeting at the Quaker community at Pendle Hill in Philadelphia that a gift of $30,000 was made to the FIC to set up a revolving loan fund to aid intentional communities. The Homer Morris Fund was named after the person who contributed or acquired most of the initial seed money. Homer Morris had been active in the Quaker charity organization, the American Friends Service Committee, aiding the development of the AFSC’s Depression era unemployed resettlement colonies. (Morgan & Crumrine, p. 1)

	One of the most successful of the resettlement colonies was Penn-Craft near Uniontown, Pennsylvania, begun in 1937. “Craft” in the name of the colony refers to the Craft family farm which was acquired for the community. Much of the money for starting Penn-Craft was donated by the U.S. Steel Corp. which had reduced its mining operations in the area, resulting in the rising local unemployment rate. Two members of the near-by Division of Subsistence Homesteads colony, named Norvelt, left their government project to help build Penn-Craft. It had fifty home sites on two-hundred acres, with a cooperative store, the beginnings of a business in the form of a “knitting mill,” and many social service activities. Penn-Craft was so successful that adjacent land was acquired in 1946 for an additional fifteen homesteads. (Fairfield, 1971, p. 22; Miller, 1998, p. 137) 

	Gris Morgan coordinated the Homer Morris Fund for many years, and unfortunately the fund dwindled rather than grew. $2,500 loaned to the Toe Valley News, a newspaper serving the area around Celo Community, was reported delinquent in the March 1960 FIC newsletter, after the Toe Valley News went out of business. 

	When tax-exempt status was acquired from the IRS in 1975, the fund’s name was changed to the Community Educational Service Council, Inc (CESCI), emphasizing its primary intent of education and service, with its most active board members residing at Tanguy Homesteads, most notably Rubin Close who served as incorporator when the Fund received its tax-exemption. While a number of the Fund’s loans were never repaid, Dan Questenberry reports that the fund completed its 100th “community business loan” about 1990, slowly rebuilding its assets back up to and over its original endowment. For decades the Fellowship and CESCI held combined weekend meetings, with the technical and tedious CESCI business meetings held on Sunday morning after the comparatively wild Fellowship social events held Saturday evening. (Andersen, 11-22-1991; Morgan, 1960, p. 8; Questenberry, p. 119) 

	After about ten years of mutually rewarding communitarian fellowship, the beginning of the end of the First Fellowship began with the story of the coming to America of the Bruderhof.

	The story of the Bruderhof begins in Germany with the life of Eberhard Arnold (1883-1935), who as a teenager experienced an intense Christian epiphany, then became an activist in the German Christian Student’s Union, which Timothy Miller describes as a, “broad-based revolt against entrenched tradition in German religious bodies and other social institutions.” (Huntington, 1997, p. 343; Miller, 1998, p. 173; Oved, 361)

	The youth movements in Germany before and between the two World Wars merit consideration in part because there are parallels between them and the American youth movement of the 1960s, and perhaps among some young adults of all generations. There are also general lessons regarding the dynamics between the alternative and the dominant cultures that can be deduced from understanding early 20th century German history. John de Graaf identifies some of these lessons in his article, “The Wandervogel” (meaning wondering birds or Free Birds!), appearing in the Fall 1977 issue of The CoEvolution Quarterly.

	John de Graaf quotes Stanley High’s 1923 book The Revolt of Youth, stating that among German youth of his day, “Nothing is so roundly hated as the imposition of conventional authority and nothing so loved as nature.” High explains that among German youth, “there is an inexplicable reaction against conventional Christianity,” and that, “Always the members stood against any political alignment … [while] great spiritual forces [were] on the ascendancy.” (Stanley High, 1923, quoted in de Graaf, p. 14)

	The Industrial Revolution came to Western Europe in the early 19th century, after its beginning in England, and it had much the same reaction against it in Germany as elsewhere. People left the agrarian lifestyle of the countryside for the urban lifestyle of crowded housing and polluted air and water to become part of the prosperous German middle class, or at least the comfortable working class. While industrialization was somewhat less oppressive to the workers in Germany than in comparison with other industrializing nations, the technological and social changes it brought about were still antagonistic to the sensibilities of their children. (de Graaf, p. 15) 

"In 1896, the Wandervogel youth movement was formed, with the children of suburban Berlin setting off for the woods in retreat from a life which, however prosperous, had lost its meaning. These youths, many with long hair, were joined by various other groups of young Germans who sought in some way to protest the staid and boring life of their parents." (de Graaf, p. 15)

	German writers like Hermann Hesse tapped into this cultural angst with popular books like Beneath the Wheel published in 1906, and Steppenwolf published between the World Wars in 1927. Expressing the sentiments of the alternative culture, Hermann Hesse wrote about his own thoughts that, …
"The less able I am to believe in our epoch and the more arid and depraved mankind seems in my eyes, the less I look to revolution as the remedy and the more I believe in the magic of love." (Hermann Hesse, quoted in de Graaf, p. 17)

	With the German defeat at the end of World War One the entire culture, and especially German youth, was fraught with despair, and many turned to mysticism in a manner similar to how the surviving Native Americans on their reservations turned to the mystical Ghost Dance after their defeat in the Plains Indian Wars.

	After 1919, John de Graaf writes, communal colonies were established by German youth in the countryside as a means of escaping industrial society, while students formed cooperatives to provide for themselves housing, food, and other necessities. As in Denmark and Spain, the German youth movement advocated educational reform as the “Folk School” movement, found in the U.S. among progressive schools such as Antioch College and the Highlander Folk School in Kentucky, now called the Highlander Research and Education Center. “The German Free School Association battled the ‘Prussian spirit’ of authoritarian rote learning which prevailed in the public schools.” (de Graaf, pp. 16-7)

	The paramilitary Hitler Youth organization begun in 1922 subverted all other youth organizations, oppressing their members and imprisoning their leaders, as they did even the cooperative movements and any other association that opposed control by Hitler’s Nazi Party. (De Graaf, p. 18)

	John de Graaf makes the point in his Wandervogel article that it was the non-political orientation of the early German youth movements that resulted in their naiveté with regard to politics, setting up young women and men for manipulation by and submission to the fascist disaster of Nazism. (de Graaf, p. 18)

	Into this scene came Eberhard Arnold, earning a Ph.D. in theology in 1909, while becoming a Christian socialist. He and his wife, Emmy, rented a farmhouse in Sannerz, Hesse, Germany in 1920, inviting friends to live with them to create a Christian commune. This religious orientation was contrary to the main stream of the German youth movements of the day, which is quite similar to how the Christian “Jesus Freak” communalists were a minority of the 1960s American, European, and other communal movements. (Miller, 1998, p. 173; Oved, p. 361)

	In the book, Children in Community, Emmy Arnold explained in 1963 the beginning of her and her husband’s lives as Christian communitarians. 
"In Germany after the First World War, the Youth Movement arose and was very much alive in our Christian circles. My husband, Eberhard Arnold, and I were closely connected with this movement for many years. We were part of a group of people who often met in our home in Berlin in a search for a new, genuine way of life. A few of these people felt together the very strong urge to build up a life in truthfulness, simplicity, and poverty, as opposed to the life we saw everywhere around us.

	"In the year 1920 this community life came into being; a very simple life in complete sharing was begun by a little group in Sannerz, Hesse. This life in community has continued for over fifty years. We have gone through sorrow and struggle, yet we have known deep joy and enthusiasm.

	"A life shared in common is a miracle. People cannot remain together for the sake of traditions. Community must be given again and again as a new birth." (Society of Brothers, p. 173)

	Making progress, Arnold’s group purchased a farm in the Rhon mountains and adopted the name, “Rhon Bruderhof” or Rhon Society of Brothers, in 1926. Two years later Arnold and friends learned of the history of the Hutterites in Europe, founded in 16th century Germany as an Anabaptist group during the Protestant Reformation, and that they still existed in America and Canada. Appreciating the similarities between his community and the Hutterites, Arnold contacted them, and he and Emmy traveled to the Hutterite colonies in the U.S. and Canada in 1930. Some Hutterites also visited the Rhon Bruderhof. (Miller, 1998, p. 173; Oved, p. 361)

	With the rise of the Nazi state in Germany in 1933 the pacifist Rhon Bruderhof saved its young men and women from conscription into the military first by relocating to Liechtenstein, creating the Alm Bruderhof, then as the German army was invading European nations, they relocated again to England between 1936 and ‘38. All, that is, except Eberhard Arnold who died in 1935 after an unsuccessful surgery. In England the Bruderhof gained many converts, yet now the threat was from the English policy of interning German citizens after England’s declaration of war against Germany. Now the Bruderhof requested immigration to Canada and the United States, yet were refused by both. They applied to many different countries, finding that only Paraguay in South America would accept them, perhaps due to the Paraguayan’s familiarity with communal groups resulting from their Jesuit and Guarani community history of the 17th and 18th centuries. 350 Bruderhof members moved to Paraguay in 1941, purchasing a 20,000 acre ranch they named Primavera. By 1950 there were 600 people in three separate colonies or “hofs.” After World War Two the Bruderhof began its immigration to the United States, beginning with visiting various intentional communities. (Miller, 1998, pp. 173-4; Oved, p. 361)

	Some of the Hutterites at the Forest River Colony in North Dakota appreciated the Bruderhof form of Christian community and invited the Bruderhof to join them. A teenager at the Forest River colony in 1955, Ruth Baer Lambach, later wrote that the Bruderhof came into Forest River “like a hurricane.” They were a “patchwork community of eccentrics, intellectuals, dissident seekers of truth, and creative practitioners of radical Christianity.” They ran up huge phone bills calling their other Bruderhofs, annoyed the Hutterite leadership, and caused a schism at Forest River, with those loyal to the Hutterite leadership leaving their home to join other Hutterite colonies. Most of the Bruderhof left Paraguay, settling in 1954 in the Woodcrest Bruderhof, just founded the previous year near Rifton, New York, and the remaining Forest River Hutterites left their remote North Dakota colony to purchase land nearby in Farmington, Pennsylvania, creating the Oak Lane Bruderhof. (Oved, p. 362)

	Due to the demise of the Forest River Colony, relations between the Hutterites and the Bruderhof were formally ended in 1955, then reinstated in 1974 after the Bruderhof sent a mission to the Hutterites to apologize for having destroyed the latter’s Forest River Colony. The Bruderhof now adopted the name, “The Hutterian Society of Brothers,” although that did not entirely smooth over all their differences, and in 1990 two of the three main Hutterite branches, the Leherleut and the Dariusleut [“leut” pronounced loy-t meaning people] revoked their union with the Bruderhof. (Huntington, 1997, p. 343; Oved, p. 362)

	The practice of “commune raiding” by one group carrying off members of another group to increase the population of their own society was evidently a conscious and deliberate intent upon the part of the Bruderhof, which earned them much criticism within the communities movement, not just among the Hutterites. This practice is not unique to the Bruderhof, as members have historically left one group and joined another, and such realignments of membership can be considered to be a good thing as it tends to create more inter-personal connections between members of different communities, resulting in the cross-fertilization of ideas between  communities and movements. Rarely, however, does this involve the destruction of an entire community or colony as at Forest River. Yet it happened again when the Bruderhof visited the Macedonia Cooperative Community near Clarksville, Georgia. 

	Macedonia existed from 1937 to ‘58, founded by Morris Mitchell, “a liberal southern educator who believed that communitarianism could solve many of the problems of modern society.” Members of the multi-faith community were mostly of liberal Protestant backgrounds, while others had a pacifist Quaker orientation. The community grew to a population of fifty adults in the early ‘50s, creating for themselves something that few homestead land-trust communities could build, a successful business for making themselves increasingly self-reliant, which was a cottage industry making wooden toys. (Miller, 1998, pp. 158-9)

	Staughton Lynd writes about the impact of learning about the Bruderhof upon the thinking of members at Macedonia in his August 1994 letter to Ramon Sender’s Keep In Touch Newsletter. 
"During the time [my wife and I] were at Macedonia [1954-57], the community was forever defining and redefining itself in relation to the Bruderhof. The Bruderhof had lasted much longer than our community; it seemed more experienced, more sure of itself, immune to the uncertainty, groping experimentation and catastrophes experienced at Macedonia. The Bruderhof appeared to have a direct ‘hot line’ to God." (Lynd, p. 2)

	Initially about half of the members of Macedonia left to join the Bruderhof, and the other half joined later. Along with nearly all their members, the Macedonian’s also brought to the Bruderhof their precious jewel, their successful business of wooden children’s toys, called “Community Playthings.” Macedonia’s cottage business was expanded by the Bruderhof to become their primary source of income, selling expensive wooden toys and children’s furniture to nurseries and day-care centers, many of them funded by federal and local government 1960s era War-on-Poverty programs. By about 2010 the Bruderhof had expanded the business to focus upon building motorized wheel chairs for children with physical disabilities, manufacturing all of the components, including metal frames, molded plastic, and upholstery, except for the wheels, batteries, and motors. (Miller, 1998, p. 174; Morgan, 2-25-1988)

	The year before the Bruderhof settled at their Woodcrest colony near Rifton, New York in 1954, they had sent a delegation with a slide show of their history and colonies in Paraguay to visit communities around America and as Timothy Miller says, “prospect for land and support.” Miller goes on to explain that the delegation was, “warmly received at several intentional communities, some of whose members joined their ranks.” Both their membership and their number of colonies increased, to about 1,500 people and nine colonies in five countries by 1956. (Miller, 1998, p. 174)

	In a letter of February 25, 1988 to Dan Questenberry at Shannon Farm (VA), Earnest Morgan wrote from Celo Community (NC) about the Bruderhof’s impact upon communities in the U.S.:
"As you may know, the Bruderhof recruited the entire Macedonia Community, including their block business. This business, by the way, became one of the Bruderhof’s major economic activities.

	"A delegation from the Bruderhof … did visit Celo … in the early or middle 1950s. As a result of this meeting, several Celo families decided to move to the Bruderhof. ... It was my impression, at the time, that there was a considerable amount of unhappiness in the intentional community movement with regard to the Bruderhof.

	"This exodus was the direct cause of Elizabeth and myself becoming involved with the Community. ... We felt that [Camp Celo for children] was too valuable a project to be allowed to die. … Dave Salstrom later left the Bruderhof and returned to Celo. In balance, the exodus to the Bruderhof may actually have been, indirectly, a boost to Celo Community." (Morgan, Earnest, 2-25-1988)

	In addition to raiding the Forest River Hutterite colony, Macedonia, and Celo, Timothy Miller reports that most of the seven members of the Kingwood Community near Frenchtown, New Jersey, a “Quaker-dominated enclave,” joined the Bruderhof in 1953. (Miller, 1998, p. 167)
 
	Alfred Andersen commented upon the Bruderhof’s FIC network affiliation and recruitment strategies in his 1997 Communities magazine article, explaining that it was at the Fellowship meeting at Pendle Hill in 1958 that Bruderhof representatives, “sent word that they would no longer participate.”

"A major factor in this estrangement may have been the feeling, on the part of one participant especially, that the Bruderhof was draining other communities of their leadership. … I saw no indication that there had been any coercion involved in these moves. Basically, the Society of Brothers offered a life of deeper commitment, and people who wanted that responded." (Andersen, 1997, p. 13)

	Alfred Anderson, President of the FIC in 1961, wrote the following about the Bruderhof’s ending of their association with the FIC in 1958, in his “Fellowship Roots” article in the winter 1997 issue of Communities magazine.
"When the Society of Brothers withdrew from the FIC, there were those who felt that FIC should be allowed to quietly die. But some felt that something precious would be lost thereby. … The sparse participation at this last conference [at Bryn Gweled, PA in 1960], plus the failure of those responsible to follow up, convinced us that FIC has reached a peaceful end." (Andersen, 1997, p.15)

	Andersen explained further in his 1991 letter that the Bruderhof announced that, “since their commitment was not to community as such, but to their particular religious way of life, centered upon the life of Jesus, that they felt they couldn’t justify putting further energy into FIC.” (Andersen, 11-22-1991)

	Beginning in 1960 there was very little Fellowship activity; the FIC being reduced to a social event accompanying the meetings of the Homer Morris Fund, incorporated as the Community Educational Service Council (CESCI) in 1975. A list of some of the communities which borrowed money from CESCI, compiled from CESCI records prior to 1990, include: Association of Light Morning, VA; Down Hill Farm, PA; East Wind, MO; Heathcote Center, MD; Plow Creek Fellowship, IL; Twin Oaks, VA; and Walden Three, RI. CESCI has also aided several community-oriented publications which evidenced its educational aspect, including: The Community Market Catalog, Communitarian, Source Catalog, Communities, and Mark Satin’s New Options. (Andersen, 8-9-75)

	The Bruderhof had taken from the Fellowship what they could, evidently draining enough of its lifeblood that the attractions of networking and fellowship no longer generated sufficient interest and energy among communitarians for traveling to attend events. Only the need to manage the money held by the movement, in the form of the Homer Morris revolving loan fund, sustained the Fellowship through the 1960s, ‘70s, and the first half of the ‘80s, along with personal networking by various individuals.

See also
 Ecovillage
 Intentional community

References

1. "Details about Fellowship for Intentional Community Inc., EIN: 35-1856776, Rutledge, MO, United States". 403 | Internal Revenue Service. Retrieved June 30, 2019.

2. Sreenivasan, Jyotsna 2008, Utopias in American History. Santa Barbara, CA, p. 144.

3. "FIC Projects and Services". The Fellowship for Intentional Communities. Archived from the original on September 2, 2011. Retrieved September 12, 2011.

Sources
 Andersen, Alfred. (1975, August 9). What is The Fellowship of Intentional Communities West? Mailing to the membership of the Fellowship of Intentional Communities.
 Andersen, Alfred. (1991, November 22). Discussion of the early Fellowship of Intentional Communities. Message posted to Quest online forum. Archive unavailable.
 Andersen, Alfred. (1997, Winter). Fellowship Roots: Where We’ve Been; Where We Might Go. Communities: Journal of Cooperative Living. 97, 12-16.
 De Graaf, John. (1977). The Wandervogel. The CoEvolution Quarterly, Fall, 14-21.
 Didcoct, Betty, ed. (1994, Summer). Celebration of Community. Communities: Journal of Cooperative Living, no. 83. Fort Collins, CO: Fellowship for Intentional Community.
 Fairfield, Richard. (1971). Communes USA: A personal tour. Penguin Books: Baltimore, MD.
 Fellowship for Intentional Community (FIC). (2010). Communities directory: A comprehensive guide to intentional communities and cooperative living. Rutledge, MO: Fellowship for Intentional Community.
 FIC 2020. (2020). FIC 2020 Annual report. Evansville, IN: Foundation for Intentional Community.
 FIC 2021. (2021). 2021 Annual report: Cultivating community, inspiring communitarians. Rutledge, MO: Foundation for Intentional Community.
 FIC 2022. (2022). 2022 Annual report: Together we can do so much. Rutledge, MO: Foundation for Intentional Community.
 Fogarty, Robert. (1972). American Utopianism. Itasca, IL: F. E. Peacock Publishers, Inc.
 Huntington, Gertrude Enders. (1997). Living in the Ark: Four Centuries of Hutterite Faith and Community. In Donald E. Pitzer (Ed.), America’s Communal Utopias. Chapel Hill, NC: University of North Carolina Press.
 Loomis, Mildred. (1980). Alternative Americas. New York: Universe Books.
 Lynd, Staughton. (8-24-1994). Keep In Touch Newsletter. Oct. 1994, Vol. VI #10, p. 2. San Francisco, CA: KIT Information Service, Peregrine Foundation.
 Miller, Timothy. (1998). The quest for utopia in twentieth-century America, Vol. I: 1900-1960. Syracuse, NY: Syracuse University Press.
 Morgan, Arthur. (1942). The small community: Foundation of democratic life. Yellow Springs, Ohio: Community Service, Inc.
 Morgan, Griscom. (1960, March). Fellowship of intentional communities newsletter. Yellow Springs, Ohio: Community Service, Inc.
 Morgan, Ernest. (1988, February 25). Letter to Dan Christenberry, a.k.a. Questenberry.
 Morgan, Griscom, ed. (1988). Guidebook for intentional communities. (Revised edition of the 1978 An intentional community handbook). Yellow Springs, OH: Community Service, Inc.
 Morgan, Jane & Crumrine, Betty. (May-June, 1984). Fellowship of Intentional Communities: Report of the conference held at Barnesville, Ohio, April 13-15, 1984. Community Service Newsletter. Yellow Springs, OH: Community Service, XXXII (3).
 Morris, James & Kross, Andrea L. (2009). The A to Z of utopianism. Lanham: Scarecrow Press.
 Oved, Yaacov. (1988). Two hundred years of American communes. New Brunswick, NJ: Transaction Books.
 Questenberry, Dan. (1990). Residential land trust organizing. In The 1990/91 Directory of intentional communities: A guide to cooperative living. Evansville, Indiana: Fellowship for Intentional Community, and Stelle, Illinois: Communities Publications Cooperative.
 Ringrose, I. & Brown, B. (1990/91). Regional Organizing: InterCommunities of Virginia. The 1990/91 Directory of intentional communities: A guide to cooperative living. Evansville, IN: Fellowship for Intentional Community and Stelle, IL: Communities Publications Cooperative.
 Schaub, Laird. (1992, fall/winter). We’re Back! Communities: Journal of Cooperative Living, no. 79. Rutledge, MO: Fellowship for Intentional Community. 
 Schaub, Laird. (2015, fall). Sky’s the limit. Communities: Life in Cooperative Culture, no. 168. Rutledge, MO: Fellowship for Intentional Community. 
 Schaub, Laird. (2022, winter). Cmag and Me. Communities: Life in Cooperative Culture, no. 197. Denver, CO: Global Ecovillage Network – United States. 
 Society of Brothers. (1973). Children in Community (2nd ed.). Rifton, NY: Plough Publishing House of The Woodcrest Service Committee, Inc.
 Tina, Cynthia. (2018, fall). Leading edges of collaboration: GENNA Alliance. Communities: Life in Cooperative Culture, no. 180. Rutledge, MO: Fellowship for Intentional Community.
 Tina, Cynthia. (2019, summer). Introducing the New FIC. Communities: Life in Cooperative Culture, no. 183. Rutledge, MO: Fellowship for Intentional Community.
 Veysey, Laurence R. (1973). The communal experience: Anarchist and mystical countercultures in America. New York: Harper & Row.

External links

Charities based in Missouri
Foundations based in the United States